The Buffalo Union-Carolina Railroad was a South Carolina railroad that operated during the middle of the 20th century.

The Buffalo Union-Carolina Railroad was a successor to the Union and Glenn Springs Railroad, which was chartered in 1899 and extended from Pride, South Carolina, to Buffalo, South Carolina, a little more than 19 miles. The line went into receivership in 1905.

The Buffalo Union-Carolina began operations along the Union and Glenn Springs line in 1922.

The Buffalo Union-Carolina was acquired by Southern Railway in the 1950s and abandoned in 1971.

References

Defunct South Carolina railroads
Predecessors of the Southern Railway (U.S.)
Railway companies established in 1922
Railway companies disestablished in 1971
American companies established in 1922